Bo Brask Helleberg (born 24 June 1974) is a Danish lightweight rower. He won a gold medal at the 1996 World Rowing Championships in Motherwell with the lightweight men's coxless pair. Helleberg was nominated for the 2008 Summer Olympics, but had to withdraw due to injury and was replaced by Morten Jørgensen.

References

1974 births
Living people
Danish male rowers
World Rowing Championships medalists for Denmark